Bookselling is the commercial trading of books which is the retail and distribution end of the publishing process. People who engage in bookselling are called booksellers, bookdealers, bookpeople, bookmen, or bookwomen. The founding of libraries in c.300 BC stimulated the energies of the Athenian booksellers.

History

In Rome, toward the end of the republic, it became the fashion to have a library, and Roman booksellers carried on a flourishing trade.

The spread of Christianity naturally created a great demand for copies of the Gospels, other sacred books, and later on for missals and other devotional volumes for both church and private use. The modern system of bookselling dates from soon after the introduction of printing. In the course of the 16th and 17th centuries the Low Countries for a time became the chief centre of the bookselling world. Modern book selling has changed dramatically with the advent of the Internet. Major websites such as Amazon, eBay, and other big book distributors offer affiliate programs and dominate book sales.

Modern era

Bookstores (called bookshops in the United Kingdom, Ireland, Australia and most of the Commonwealth, apart from Canada) may be either part of a chain, or local independent bookstores. Stores can range in size offering from several hundred to several hundred thousand titles. They may be brick and mortar stores or internet only stores or a combination of both. Sizes for the larger bookstores exceed half a million titles. Bookstores often sell other printed matter besides books, such as newspapers, magazines and maps; additional product lines may vary enormously, particularly among independent bookstores. Colleges and universities often have bookstores on campus that focus on providing course textbooks and scholarly books, and often also sell other supplies and logo merchandise. Many on-campus bookstores are owned or operated by large commercial chains such as WHSmith, Blackwell's or Waterstone's in the United Kingdom, or Barnes & Noble College Booksellers in the United States.

Another common type of bookstore is the used bookstore or second-hand bookshop which buys and sells used and out-of-print books in a variety of conditions. A range of titles are available in used bookstores, including in print and out of print books. Book collectors tend to frequent used book stores. Large online bookstores offer used books for sale, too. Individuals wishing to sell their used books using online bookstores agree to terms outlined by the bookstore(s): for example, paying the online bookstore(s) a predetermined commission once the books have sold. In Paris, the Bouquinistes are antiquarian and used booksellers who have had outdoor stalls and boxes along both sides of the Seine for hundreds of years, regulated by law since the 1850s and contributing to the scenic ambience of the city.

See also

 Book store shoplifting
 Bookstore tourism
 History of books
 Independent bookstore
 List of independent bookstores
 Quarter bin

Notes and references

Further reading
 Davis, Joshua Clark, "Una Mulzac, Black Woman Booksellers, and Pan-Africanism", AAIHS, September 19, 2016.
Lister, Anthony, 'William Ford: the Universal Bookseller' The Book Collector 38 (1989):343-371.
Thomas, Alan G. (1979). "Solomon Pottesman."The Book Collector 28 no 4:545-553.

External links

Forbes article on book collectors by Finn-Olaf Jones, December 12, 2005
The International League of Antiquarian Booksellers (ILAB)
The Independent Online Booksellers Association (IOBA)